GD-42 (methylsulfomethylate) is an irreversible acetylcholinesterase inhibitor. It has a positively charged sulfonium group.

See also
Armine (chemical)
Paraoxon
Ro 3-0419
Ro 3-0422
V-sub x

References

Acetylcholinesterase inhibitors
Phosphonothioates
Sulfonium compounds
Ethyl esters